The 1895 Latrobe Athletic Association season was their first season in existence. This season John Brallier became the first openly professional football player. The team was sponsored by the local YMCA and led by coach Russell Aukerman and manager Dave Berry.

Schedule

Game notes

References

Latrobe Athletic Association
Latrobe Athletic Association seasons